The 2014 WPA World Nine-ball Championship was the 23rd edition of the 9-Ball pool World Championships. It took place from June 16 to 27, 2014 in the al-Attiya Sports Arena of the Al-Arabi Sports Club in Doha. The Qatari capital was the fifth time in a row the venue for the 9-Ball Championships.

Dutch Niels Feijen defeated Austria's Albin Ouschan in the final, winning 13–10. Defending champion Thorsten Hohmann would lose in the round of 64, to Marco Teutscher.

Tournament format
The tournament was attended by 128 players. In the preliminary round was played in the double elimination tournament system. Winners of these games would qualify for the final round, which is played in the knockout system.

Brackets

Preliminary Round 
The preliminary round was played between the 21–24 June 2014.

The following players won one game in the double-elimination round, and were classified as finishing between 65 and 96.

The following players lost twice and won no matches in the double-elimination round, and were classified 97-128.

Final Round 
The knockout round was played between the 25–27 June 2014.

References

External links 
 WPA 9-Ball-World Championship 2014 from the World Pool-Billiard Association
 WPA World 9-Ball Championship 2015 at azbilliards.com

2015
WPA World Nine-ball Championship
WPA World Nine-ball Championship
International sports competitions hosted by Qatar
Sports competitions in Doha